The City of Salida (Spanish: , "exit") is the Statutory city that is the county seat and the most populous municipality of Chaffee County, Colorado, United States. The population was 5,666 at the 2020 census.

History
A post office has been in operation at Salida since 1881. Salida, meaning "exit" in Spanish, was named on account of its location near the point where the Arkansas River flows out of the valley and into Bighorn Sheep Canyon, upstream from the Royal Gorge.

Geography

The Mosquito Range parallels the Sawatch Range to the east, forming the Upper Arkansas Valley, and the southern terminus of the range, just east of Salida, is known locally as the Arkansas Hills. Methodist Mountain, which is a major feature on Salida's southern horizon, is the northernmost mountain in the Sangre de Cristo Mountains. To the north of Salida is the Upper Arkansas Valley and the town of Buena Vista.

Canon City and Pueblo lie to the east.

Climate
According to the Köppen climate classification, Salida has a Cold semi-arid climate (BSk)
<div style="width:65%">

</div style>

Demographics

At the 2000 census there were 5,504 people, 2,504 households, and 1,449 families living in the city. The racial makeup of the city was 92.66% White, 0.05% African American, 1.44% Native American, 0.38% Asian, 0.02% Pacific Islander, 3.29% from other races, and 2.16% from two or more races. Hispanic or Latino of any race were 10.76%.

Of the 2,504 households 25.0% had children under the age of 18 living with them, 45.9% were married couples living together, 8.6% had a female householder with no husband present, and 42.1% were non-families. 35.9% of households were one person and 15.4% were one person aged 65 or older.  The average household size was 2.15 and the average family size was 2.80.

The age distribution was 21.4% under the age of 18, 6.3% from 18 to 24, 27.5% from 25 to 44, 24.2% from 45 to 64, and 20.6% 65 or older.  The median age was 42 years. For every 100 females, there were 94.6 males.  For every 100 females age 18 and over, there were 92.7 males.

The median household income was $28,790 and the median family income  was $38,240. Males had a median income of $30,447 versus $20,867 for females. The per capita income for the city was $17,252.  About 9.2% of families and 14.8% of the population were below the poverty line, including 23.7% of those under age 18 and 13.7% of those age 65 or over.

Education
The city is served by Salida Public Schools. There are two public high schools, Salida High School and Horizons Exploratory Academy; and three middle schools, Salida Middle School, Salida Montessori Charter School, and the Crest Academy. Colorado Mountain College also has a campus in Salida.

Infrastructure

Health care
Salida and Chaffee County are served by the Heart of the Rockies Regional Medical Center, located on the north side of Town on Rush Drive.

Transportation
Salida is part of Colorado's Bustang network. It is on both the Alamosa-Pueblo and the Gunnison-Denver Outrider lines.

Culture
The Salida Downtown Historic District was added to the National Register of Historic Places in 1984. On March 30, 2012, downtown Salida was named one of two inaugural Certified Creative Districts in Colorado. Salida is also home to the Shavano Chapter of the Columbine Poets of Colorado, which is affiliated with the National Federation of State Poetry Societies (NFSPS). The group organizes workshops and festivals and offers poetry contests for both adults and students. On March 30, 2012, Colorado by Colorado Creative Industries, a division of the State’s Office of Economic Development and International Trade, announced that the City of Salida’s historic downtown was selected as one of only two inaugural “Certified Creative Districts” in Colorado.

Notable people
Sally Blane, actress
Louie Croft Boyd, Superintendent of Nurses, Rio Grande Hospital
Chris Guccione, Major League Baseball umpire
Kent Haruf, novelist
Ruth Hinshaw Spray, peace activist

See also

Outline of Colorado
Index of Colorado-related articles
State of Colorado
Colorado cities and towns
Colorado municipalities
Colorado counties

References

External links

Cities in Chaffee County, Colorado
Cities in Colorado
County seats in Colorado
Colorado populated places on the Arkansas River